Family is the second album released by May J. and her first under the label Rhythm Zone.
No singles were released from the album. It entered the daily Oricon chart at #5 and climbed to #3.

Track listing

CD track list 
 Garden feat. DJ Kaori, Diggy-Mo', Clench and Blistah
 もし君と... with Kimaguren
 旅立つ君に
 Family: Interlude-
 Story of Love
 Give My Heart
 サヨナラの他に
 Remember feat. Clench and Blistah
 Unity
 Crescent Moon: Daishi Dance Remix

DVD track list 
 もし君と… with キマグレン: Music Video
 Garden feat. DJ Kaori, Diggy-Mo’, クレンチ＆ブリスタ: Music Video
 旅立つ君に: Music Video
[bonus movie]
 "Making of" music videos and private movie in Okinawa

Charts

Oricon Sales Chart (Japan)

References

2009 albums
Avex Group albums